Mae Tischer (October 16, 1928 –January 18, 2018) was an American politician.

Tischer was born in Minnesota. In 1962, Tischer with her family moved to Alaska and homesteaded on Goose Lake. In 1965, the Tischer family moved to Anchorage, Alaska so that the children would go to high school. Tischer served as district director for the Alaska Muscular Dystrophy Association in Anchorage, Alaska. In 1983 and 1984, Tischer served in the Alaska House of Representatives and was a Republican. Tischer died at the Anchorage Pioneer House in Anchorage, Alaska on January 18, 2018.

Notes

1928 births
2018 deaths
Politicians from Anchorage, Alaska
People from Minnesota
Women state legislators in Alaska
Republican Party members of the Alaska House of Representatives
21st-century American women